Callionymus sphinx, the sphinx dragonet, is a species of dragonet known from the waters off of the Northern Territory, Australia.  This species grows to a length of  SL.

References 

S
Fish described in 1983